The Royal Mines Act 1693 (5 & 6 Will & Mary c 6) is an Act of the Parliament of England.

This Act was partly in force in Great Britain at the end of 2010.

Section 2
This section was repealed by section 1 of, and Part VII of the Schedule to, the Statute Law (Repeals) Act 1969.

References
Halsbury's Statutes,
John Raithby (editor). The Statutes of the Realm. 1819. Volume 6. Pages 446 to 447. Digitised copy from British History Online.

External links
The Royal Mines Act 1693, as amended, from Legislation.gov.uk.

Acts of the Parliament of England
1693 in law
1693 in England
Mining in England
Mining law and governance